He Ning (born November 13, 1990) is a Chinese gymnast born in the province of Zhejiang.

Competitive history
She is known from the 2006 Asian Games in Doha. She won 2 gold medals in Team and All-Around competitions. She was a member of the gold-winning team for the 2006 World Artistic Gymnastics Championships in Aarhus, Denmark, and that was the Chinese women team's first-ever gold medal in team competition in the World Artistic Gymnastics Championships. She was also a member of the silver medal-winning team for the 2007 World Artistic Gymnastics Championships in Stuttgart, Germany.

She failed to make the 2008 Olympic team, while she was the 7th gymnast to be considered as an Olympic team member. Her last competition in 2008 was the Gymnastics World Cup held in Stuttgart, Germany. She won a gold on uneven bars by earning a 15.350.

References

External links
 

1990 births
Living people
Chinese female artistic gymnasts
Medalists at the World Artistic Gymnastics Championships
Sportspeople from Ningbo
Asian Games medalists in gymnastics
Gymnasts at the 2006 Asian Games
Asian Games gold medalists for China
Asian Games silver medalists for China
Universiade medalists in gymnastics
Medalists at the 2006 Asian Games
Gymnasts from Zhejiang
Universiade gold medalists for China
Universiade silver medalists for China
Universiade bronze medalists for China
Medalists at the 2009 Summer Universiade